The 1873 college football season had no clear-cut champion, with the Official NCAA Division I Football Records Book listing Princeton as having been selected national champions.

Organized intercollegiate football was first played in the state of Virginia and the Southern United States when Washington & Lee defeated VMI 4 to 2. Some industrious students of the two schools organized a game for October 23, 1869 – but it was rained out. 

Students of the University of Virginia were playing pickup games of the kicking-style of football as early as 1870, and some accounts even claim it organized a game against Washington and Lee College in 1871, but no record has been found of the score of this contest. Due to scantness of records of the prior matches some will claim Virginia v. Pantops Academy November 13, 1887, as the first game in Virginia.

Conference standings

References